Far North is a former New Zealand parliamentary electorate, which existed for one parliamentary term from 1993 to 1996, and was held by National's John Carter.

Population centres
Based on the 1991 New Zealand census, an electoral redistribution was carried out. This resulted in the abolition of nine electorates, and the creation of eleven new electorates. Through an amendment in the Electoral Act in 1965, the number of electorates in the South Island was fixed at 25, so the new electorates increased the number of the North Island electorates by two. In the South Island, one electorate was abolished and one electorate was recreated. In the North Island, five electorates were newly created (including Far North), five electorates were recreated, and eight electorates were abolished.

Polling booths where more than 1,000 votes were cast were located in Kaikohe, Kaitaia, and Kerikeri.

History
John Carter of the National Party was the electorate's representative during its existence from 1993 to 1996. After the Far North electorate was abolished in 1996, Carter transferred to the new Northland electorate, which he represented until his retirement from parliament in July 2011.

Members of Parliament
Key

Election results

1993 election

References

Historical electorates of New Zealand
1993 establishments in New Zealand
1996 disestablishments in New Zealand